Aranguren is a town and municipality located in the province and autonomous community of Navarre, northern Spain.

See also
Hand of Irulegi
Mutilva Alta

References

External links
Ayuntamiento de Aranguren
 ARANGUREN in the Bernardo Estornés Lasa - Auñamendi Encyclopedia (Euskomedia Fundazioa) 

Municipalities in Navarre